The Yiling Yangtze River Bridge is a cable-stayed bridge over the Yangtze River in the city-center of Yichang, Hubei. It has 3 towers and two main spans, with a total of 4 spans including the side spans. It is a road bridge which carries four lanes of roadway and has a toll booth at one end. The bridge has a singular cable tension system, which carries the deck from the center. The Bridge crosses the Yangtze River, near Dagongqiao in Yichang. The main spans are 346 meters each. At the end of the bridge, to the south there is a cloverleaf interchange after the toll booth which is and exchange for the road.

The bridge is 6.4 kilometers downriver from the Three Gorges Dam.

See also
 Yangtze River bridges and tunnels

External links

References

Bridges in Hubei
Bridges completed in 2001
Bridges over the Yangtze River
Cable-stayed bridges in China
Road bridges in China
Yichang
Toll bridges in China